The 2013–14 Ottawa Senators season was the team's 22nd season in the National Hockey League (NHL). The 2013–14 season was the first season of a re-organization by the NHL of its divisions. Ottawa was placed in a new Atlantic Division with the Boston Bruins, Buffalo Sabres, Detroit Red Wings, Florida Panthers, Montreal Canadiens, Tampa Bay Lightning and Toronto Maple Leafs. The Senators failed to qualify for the 2014 Stanley Cup playoffs.

This was also the team's first season since 1993–94 without long-time captain and Senators legend Daniel Alfredsson. Alfredsson signed with the Detroit Red Wings in July 2013 and played his final season there before retiring from the NHL in late 2014.

Off-season
In June 2013, the Senators traded impending free agent Sergei Gonchar to the Dallas Stars for a sixth-round pick in the 2013 NHL Entry Draft. The Senators chose Chris Leblanc with the pick.

On July 5, two moves came about that changed the face of the franchise. In a surprise move that shocked Ottawa fans, captain and multiple franchise record holder Daniel Alfredsson signed a contract to play with the Detroit Red Wings, ending his 17-year association with Ottawa. "It pretty much came down to a selfish decision in terms of I have not won a Stanley Cup, a big priority for me," Alfredsson explained in a candid conference call with the media. He continued explaining how hard of a decision it was and gave his reasoning. "I feel that in Ottawa they are getting closer and closer and they have a really bright future in front of them, but at this point in my career there's not much left," Alfredsson said. "I don't have the time to wait for that." In a later press conference, Alfredsson expressed his dissatisfaction in negotiations with the Senators. Alfredsson stated that an understanding to compensate Alfredsson for the low salary he had taken in the 2012–13 season was not lived up to. Alfredsson had taken a below-value $1-million salary in 2012–13 in his contract to lower the long-term salary cap hit for his contract, but was not expecting to play the season. When Alfredsson decided to play the 2012–13 season, he had expected to re-negotiate the contract at that time, but the Senators did not re-open contract negotiations, and Alfredsson decided to play the season at the salary and seek compensation in the 2013–14 contract. The Senators wanted to pay Alfredsson his market value for 2013–14, without any extra to cover 2012–13.

Later on July 5, the Senators made a major trade with the Anaheim Ducks, picking up multiple 30-goal scorer Bobby Ryan. The Senators had to give up first-year player Jakob Silfverberg, junior prospect Stefan Noesen and the team's first-round pick in the 2014 NHL Entry Draft. Ryan, who had been the subject of many trade rumours, tweeted, "I'm coming in hot, Ottawa," a reference to the film Top Gun. Ryan was expected to play on the top line with Jason Spezza and Milan Michalek.

The Senators signed two free agents, forward Clarke MacArthur from Toronto and defenceman Joe Corvo from Carolina. Corvo had previously played with Ottawa from 2006 to 2008 and was a member of the team that made it to the 2007 Stanley Cup Final. Forward Peter Regin and defenceman Andre Benoit left the team as free agents, Regin to the New York Islanders and Benoit to Colorado.

Regular season
On December 1, former captain Daniel Alfredsson made his first return visit to Ottawa as a member of the Detroit Red Wings. Alfredsson was honoured with a video tribute before the game and a standing ovation from the fans. Alfredsson scored an empty net goal, enabling him to have scored against all 30 NHL teams. Alfredsson also had an assist on Detroit's first goal. The Red Wings won the game 4–2.

Assistant general manager Tim Murray left the team on January 9, 2014, to become the general manager of the Buffalo Sabres. Director of player personnel Pierre Dorion and director of hockey operations and player development Randy Lee became joint assistant general managers, splitting the duties Tim Murray was responsible for. General manager Bryan Murray's contract was extended for two years on January 13, taking on the additional title of president of hockey operations. After the expiry of two years, Murray is set to become an advisor to the Senators.

The Senators played in the 2014 Heritage Classic game against the Vancouver Canucks on March 2, 2014, at BC Place, Vancouver. The Senators unveiled a white version of their heritage third jersey for the game. The Canucks resurrected a uniform of the Vancouver Millionaires of the Pacific Coast Hockey Association from the 1910s for the game. The Senators won the game 4–2.

At the trade deadline of March 5, the team was four points out of a playoff spot. The team added Ales Hemsky for the stretch run, giving up two draft picks. Winger Cory Conacher and defenceman Joe Corvo were put on waivers, with Conacher being picked up by the Buffalo Sabres. Corvo was not picked up and he was loaned to the Chicago Wolves of the AHL. The Senators also made two minor league deals, sending university player Jeff Costello to the Vancouver Canucks for minor league defenceman Patrick Mullen. Binghamton player Andre Petersson was traded to the Anaheim Ducks for defenceman Alex Grant. Veteran defenceman and assistant captain Chris Phillips was re-signed for two years.

The Senators, whom a lot of media had predicted were going to contend in the Eastern Conference, were eliminated from playoff contention on April 8.

Standings

Schedule and results

Pre-season

Regular season

Awards and milestones

Player statistics
Final Stats 
Scoring

Goaltenders

†Denotes player spent time with another team before joining the Senators.  Stats reflect time with the Senators only.
‡No longer with team.
Bold/italics denotes franchise record

Transactions

Trades

Free agents signed

Free agents lost

Claimed via waivers

Lost via waivers

Player signings

Draft picks

Ottawa Senators' picks at the 2013 NHL Entry Draft, which was held in Newark, New Jersey on June 30, 2013.

Draft notes

 The Ottawa Senators' second-round pick went to the St. Louis Blues as the result of a February 26, 2012, trade that sent Ben Bishop to the Senators in exchange for this pick.
 The Philadelphia Flyers' fourth-round pick went to the Ottawa Senators (via Tampa Bay), the Lightning traded this pick to Ottawa as a result of an April 3, 2013, trade that sent Ben Bishop to the Lightning in exchange for Cory Conacher and this pick.
 The Dallas Stars' sixth-round pick went to the Ottawa Senators as a result of a June 7, 2013, trade that sent the rights to Sergei Gonchar to the Stars in exchange for this pick.
 The Ottawa Senators' seventh-round pick went to the Calgary Flames (via Chicago), Ottawa traded this pick to the Chicago Blackhawks as the result of a December 2, 2011, trade that sent Rob Klinkhammer to the Senators in exchange for this pick.

References

Ottawa Senators seasons
Ottawa Senators season, 2013-14
Ottawa
Ottawa Senators
Ottawa Senators